The Kotcho Formation is a stratigraphical unit of middle Famennian age in the Western Canadian Sedimentary Basin. 

It takes the name from Kotcho Lake, and was first described in the Imperial Island River No. 1 by H.R. Belyea and D.J. McLaren in 1962.

Lithology
The Kotcho Formation is composed of green-grey shale, locally bituminous, with thin argillaceous limestone beds or lenses.

Distribution

Relationship to other units

The Kotcho Formation is overlain by the Exshaw Formation and conformably overlays the Tetcho Formation.

To the east, it grades into the upper Wabamun Group carbonate, and to the south-west into the Palliser Formation. To the east it is replaced by the Besa River Formation shale.

References

Stratigraphy of British Columbia
Stratigraphy of the Northwest Territories